The 33rd Canadian Parliament was in session from November 5, 1984, until October 1, 1988.  The membership was set by the 1984 federal election on September 4, 1984, and it only changed slightly due to resignations and by-elections prior to being dissolved before the 1988 election.

It was controlled by a Progressive Conservative majority under Prime Minister Brian Mulroney and the 24th Canadian Ministry. The Official Opposition was the Liberal Party, led by former prime minister John Turner.

The Speaker was first John William Bosley and then John Allen Fraser.  See also List of Canadian electoral districts 1976-1987 for a list of the ridings in this parliament.

There were two sessions of the 33rd Parliament:

Party standings

The party standings as of the election and as of dissolution were as follows:

Members of the House of Commons
Members of the House of Commons in the 33rd parliament arranged by province.

Newfoundland

 James McGrath resigned from Parliament and was replaced by Jack Harris in a July 20, 1987, by-election

Prince Edward Island

Nova Scotia

New Brunswick

Quebec

* Clément M. Côté resigned and was replaced by Lucien Bouchard in a June 20, 1988, by-election.
** Don Johnston resigned from the Liberal caucus to sit as an Independent Liberal on January 18, 1988.
*** Suzanne Blais-Grenier expelled from the Progressive Conservative for refusing to withdraw allegations of kickbacks involving the Quebec wing of the party and sat as an Independent on September 21, 1988.
**** Jean Chrétien resigned from parliament due to poor relations with the party leader.  He was replaced by Gilles Grondin in a September 29, 1987, by-election.
***** Robert Toupin left the Progressive Conservative sat as an Independent on May 14, 1986 and join the New Democratic Party on December 16, 1986. And left the NDP to sit again as an Independent on October 26, 1987.

Ontario

* Ian Deans left parliament to be appointed to a position in the federal government and was replaced by Marion Dewar in a 1987 by-election.

Manitoba

Saskatchewan

Alberta

British Columbia

Northern Territories

* Erik Nielsen left parliament to become head of the National Transportation Agency and was replaced by Audrey McLaughlin in a 1987 by-election.

By-elections

References

Succession

 
Canadian parliaments
1984 establishments in Canada
1988 disestablishments in Canada
1984 in Canadian politics
1985 in Canadian politics
1986 in Canadian politics
1987 in Canadian politics
1988 in Canadian politics